The Glasi Hergiswil is a Swiss factory that manufactures glass in Nidwalden, Switzerland. It was founded by the brothers Siegwart in 1817. The Glasi was threatened to be closed because of old machines and technology. It remains open, due to the efforts of the community, and offers visitors the opportunity to observe workers as they produce the glass. The Glasi has a museum and is home to the first glass labyrinth in Switzerland.

References
 Glasi Hergiswil: Neue Familienattraktion in der Glasi Hergiswil from Presseportal 
 Phänomenales rund ums Glas from Zisch

External links

 Official website

Manufacturing companies established in 1817
Glassmaking companies of Switzerland
Buildings and structures in Nidwalden
Swiss companies established in 1817
Museums in Nidwalden
Art museums and galleries in Switzerland
Glass museums and galleries
Swiss brands